Woods Bay State Park is a state park located near the town of Olanta in Florence County, South Carolina. The park contains some of the last remaining large Carolina Bays. Recent work by the U.S. Geological Survey has interpreted the Carolina Bays as relict thermokarst lakes that formed several thousands of years ago when the climate was colder, drier, and windier.  Thermokarst lakes develop by thawing of frozen ground (permafrost) and by subsequent modification by wind and water. Thus, this interpretation suggests that permafrost once extended as far south as the Carolina Bays during the last ice age and (or) previous ice ages.

Activities available at the park include picnicking, fishing, hiking, bird watching and geocaching. Canoeing is also popular on the one-mile canoe trail in the Carolina Bay. While private boats are not allowed, rental canoes and kayaks are available.

Amenities include a picnic shelter, a boardwalk through a cypress-tupelo swamp and a nature center.

References

External links
Official Website

State parks of South Carolina
Protected areas of Florence County, South Carolina
Protected areas established in 1973
1973 establishments in South Carolina